Parivartan Sandesh Foundation is an Indian non-governmental organisation operating in the state of New Delhi working for the betterment and development of deprived and marginalized population through promoting various programs in India to ensure right to education, access to health services, empowering adolescents through vocational skills to have better livelihood chances & spreading awareness of social issues. It was founded in 2010

Parivartan Sandesh Foundation mission is to promote sustainable social change by improving the living conditions of vulnerable populations, especially children.

To act upon the causes of Poverty and inequality by influence the policies and actions at a result oriented levels.
To identify and work alongside the economically and socially deprived- starting with children, so that they become educated, skilled and aware.

Parivartan Sandesh Launched a project Saksham Nari, Sashakt Samaj with the objective to provide unemployed women with more skills through training and capacity building.

On 6 July 2016, Parivartan Sandesh Foundation associated with Tihar administration organised a painting competition for the kids of women inmates of Tihar Central Jail.
 
In July 2015, Parivartan sandesh Foundation started a scholarship programme Samarth to financially and other assistance to student for their higher education in India.

References

External links 
 Parivartan Sandesh Foundation website 

 
Charities based in India
Non-profit organisations based in India
Social welfare charities
2010 establishments in Delhi